Krab (Краб - Crab) was a submarine built for the Imperial Russian Navy. She was designed by Mikhail Petrovich Nalyotov as the world's first submarine minelayer, although due to construction delays the German UC submarines entered service earlier. The mines were stowed in two horizontal galleries exiting through the stern. Diving depth was 45 metres. This ship was built by the Naval yard in Nikolayev by the Black Sea (now Mykolaiv, Ukraine). She was ordered in 1908, launched in September 1912 (or early 1913, sources differ) and entered service in 1915.

Service

This submarine fought during World War I in the Black Sea Fleet. She laid several minefields which accounted for the sinking of the Turkish gunboat Isa Reis and the Bulgarian torpedo boat Shumni as well as several merchant ships. After the Russian Revolution of 1917 the boat was captured by the Germans and transferred to the British intervention force who scuttled the boat near Sevastopol to prevent capture by the Bolsheviks. The wreck was raised in 1935 and scrapped.

References
 Chesneau, Roger, ed. (1980). Conway's All the World's Fighting Ships 1922–1946. Greenwich, UK: Conway Maritime Press. .
 Page in English
 Page in Russian from Black Sea Fleet
 Page in Russian Language

Submarines of the Imperial Russian Navy
Ships built at the Black Sea Shipyard
1912 ships
World War I submarines of Russia
Ships built in the Russian Empire